Vacaville Town Hall also known as Old Town Hall is a historic building in Vacaville, California, United States.  It was designed by F.A. Steiger and built in 1907.  It was listed on the National Register of Historic Places in 1978.  The listing included one other historically contributing building.

It is a two-story  building.

References

Buildings and structures in Vacaville, California
Former seats of local government
Town halls in California